MV ABT Summer was an oil tanker which was built at the South Korean shipbuilding yard of Ulsan and launched in 1974. The vessel was 344 meters in length and almost 54 meters in breadth. An unexplained explosion occurred on May 28, 1991, and the ship and its cargo began to burn. Five of the crew of thirty-two were killed in the incident, four of whom were initially reported as missing. The ship continued to burn for three days before sinking on June 1. The vessel's 260,000 tonne cargo of oil was lost, leaving a visible slick on the ocean surface of approximately eighty square miles. Attempts to locate the wreck following the incident proved unsuccessful.

See also 
List of oil spills

References 

Oil spills in international waters
Maritime disasters
Oil spills in Africa
Maritime incidents in 1991